Samuel Barnett Schryver  (15 March 1869 – 21 August 1929) was a British biochemist. Among other subjects, his work studied autolysis of tumours, gastric juice in diseases of the stomach, and coagulation.

Biography
Samuel Barnett Schryver was born in London to Jewish parents Lewis and Elisabeth Schryver. He was educated at the University College School, before going on to study at University College London, the Zurich Polytechnikum, and the University of Leipzig, graduating with a Ph.D. from the latter institution. He worked as Demonstrator in Chemistry at University College Liverpool from 1893 until 1897, and then as a researcher at the Wellcome Research Laboratories until March 1901, when he was appointed Lecturer in Physiological Chemistry at University College London.

In 1907 Schryver began working as a chemist at the Research Institute of the Cancer Hospital, and in 1913 joined the faculty of the Imperial College of Science, becoming full Professor in 1920. He was elected a Fellow of the Royal Society in 1928.

He was married to Elsie Naomi Davis, sister of poet Nina Salaman.

Bibliography
Besides nearly a hundred scientific papers and notes, Schryver published the following books:

References

1869 births
1929 deaths
19th-century British Jews
20th-century British Jews
Academics of Imperial College London
Academics of the Institute of Cancer Research
Academics of the University of Liverpool
Academics of University College London
Alumni of University College London
English biochemists
English Jews
ETH Zurich alumni
Jewish British scientists
Fellows of the Royal Society
Leipzig University alumni
People educated at University College School